The National Society of Film Critics Award for Best Actress is an annual award given by the National Society of Film Critics to honour the best leading actress of the year.

Winners

1960s

1970s

1980s

1990s

2000s

2010s

2020s

Multiple awards
3 wins
Vanessa Redgrave (1969, 1984, 1985)
Liv Ullmann (1968, 1973, 1974)

2 wins
 Cate Blanchett (2013, 2022)
 Julie Christie (1997, 2007)
 Sally Hawkins (2008, 2017)
 Sissy Spacek (1976, 1980)
 Reese Witherspoon (1999, 2005)

See also
 National Board of Review Award for Best Actress
 New York Film Critics Circle Award for Best Actress
 Los Angeles Film Critics Association Award for Best Actress

References

National Society of Film Critics Awards
Film awards for lead actress